The 2018 Eliteserien was the 74th completed season of top-tier football in Norway. This was second season of Eliteserien as rebranding from Tippeligaen.

The season began on 11 March and ended 24 November 2018, not including play-off matches. Fixtures for the 2018 season were announced on 19 December 2017. Rosenborg were the defending champions, while Bodø/Glimt, Start and Ranheim entered as the promoted teams from the 2017 1. divisjon.

Rosenborg won their fourth consecutive title, their 26th top-flight title overall, with one match to spare following a 1–0 away win against Start on 11 November 2018.

Overview

Summary
Brann started the season well and won eight of their nine opening games. They lost their first match 0–4 against Molde in the 15th round. Rosenborg started the season poorly with no win in the first three games, but managed to tighten the gap to Brann. Head coach Kåre Ingebrigtsen was sacked on 19 July although Rosenborg was placed second in the league, two points behind Brann at the time. 

On 11 November, Rosenborg were confirmed as Eliteserien champions following their 1–0 away win against Start in the 29th round. They won their fourth consecutive title and 26th top-flight title overall. Molde won eight of their final nine games and finished in second place, five points behind Rosenborg.

Sandefjord were the first team to be relegated to the 1. divisjon when they drew 1–1 against Sarpsborg 08 in their penultimate game. Before the 30th and final round, five teams were in risk of either relegation or relegation play-offs. Start lost 1–3 away to Haugesund and was relegated as the second team from bottom. Stabæk drew 2–2 against Strømsgodset after a goal by Strømsgodset's Mustafa Abdellaoue in the last minute of the game. That goal made sure Strømsgodset retained their spot in the next season's Eliteserien, while Stabæk were forced to play relegation play-offs. Stabæk won the play-offs against Aalesund 2–1 on aggregate and retained their spot in Eliteserien.

Teams
Sixteen teams competed in the league – the top thirteen teams from the previous season, and three teams promoted from 1. divisjon. The promoted teams were Bodø/Glimt, Start (both returning to the top flight after a season's absence) and Ranheim (returned to the top flight after an absence of sixty-one years). They replaced Sogndal, Aalesund and Viking ending their top flight spells of two, eleven and twenty-nine years respectively.

Stadia and locations

Note: Table lists in alphabetical order.

Notes

Personnel and kits

Managerial changes

Transfers

Winter

Summer

League table

Positions by round

Relegation play-offs

The 14th-placed team, Stabæk takes part in a two-legged play-off against Aalesund, the winners of the 1. divisjon promotion play-offs, to decide who will play in the 2019 Eliteserien.

Stabæk won 2–1 on aggregate and retained their position in Eliteserien.

Results

Season statistics

Top scorers

Hat-tricks

Notes
4 Player scored 4 goals(H) – Home team(A) – Away team

Top assists

Clean sheets

Discipline

Player

Most yellow cards: 10
 Flamur Kastrati (Sandefjord/Kristiansund)

Most red cards: 1
 Aliou Coly (Kristiansund)
 Simon Larsen (Start)
 Mathias Normann (Molde)
 Jacob Rasmussen (Rosenborg)
 Ivan Näsberg (Vålerenga)
 Lars-Jørgen Salvesen (Start)
 Emil Pálsson (Sandefjord)
 Tokmac Nguen (Strømsgodset)
 Abdisalam Ibrahim (Vålerenga)
 Frode Kippe (Lillestrøm)
 Marius Amundsen (Lillestrøm)
 Ivar Furu (Ranheim)

Club

Most yellow cards: 57  
Start

Most red cards: 2
Lillestrøm
Start
Vålerenga

Attendances

Awards

References

Eliteserien seasons
0
Norway
Norway